Albatross is a 1977 compilation album by British blues rock band Fleetwood Mac and Christine Perfect and was released on the Embassy label in the UK and Europe.  Side A consists of early tracks by Fleetwood Mac.  Side B consists of tracks by Christine Perfect who, by the time of the album's release, was a member of Fleetwood Mac under the name of Christine McVie.

Track listing
Side 1 – Fleetwood Mac
 "Albatross"
 "Rambling Pony"
 "I Believe My Time Ain't Long"
 "Doctor Brown"
 "Stop Messin' Round"
 "Love That Burns"
 "Jigsaw Puzzle Blues"
 "Need Your Love Tonight"

Side 2 – Christine Perfect
 "I'd Rather Go Blind"
 "Crazy 'Bout You Baby"
 "And That's Saying a Lot"
 "I'm on My Way"
 "No Road Is the Right Road"
 "Let Me Go (Leave Me Alone)"
 "I'm Too Far Gone (To Turn Around)"
 "When You Say"

References

External links

1977 compilation albums
Fleetwood Mac compilation albums